Coelopella is a genus of kelp flies in the family Coelopidae.

Species
Coelopella curvipes (Hutton, 1902)

References

Coelopidae
Sciomyzoidea genera